Isis (sometimes stylized ISIS)  was an American post-metal band formed in Boston, Massachusetts in 1997. The band borrowed from and helped to evolve the post-metal sound pioneered by bands such as Neurosis and Godflesh, characterized by lengthy songs focusing on repetition and evolution of structure. Isis's last studio album, Wavering Radiant, was released on May 5, 2009. Isis disbanded in June 2010, just before the release of a split EP with the Melvins. In 2018, the group reformed as Celestial for a one-off show to pay tribute to Caleb Scofield.

History

Formation, Celestial, and other early releases (1997–2001)
In Boston, several sessions of experimentation led friends Aaron Turner (guitar/vocals; also the owner of Hydra Head Records and its subsidiary, HH Noise Industries), Jeff Caxide (bass guitar), Chris Mereschuk (electronics/vocals) and Aaron Harris (drums) to form Isis in autumn of 1997. As Turner stated, "Isis formed as a result of the dissatisfaction with past bands of the founding members. None of us were happy with what we were doing musically at the time, two of us lived together, we had similar tastes and similar record collections." The band began playing out in the spring of 1998, and recorded a demo at Salad Days Studios shortly thereafter. After an East Coast tour in the summer of 1998 where they were joined by Randy Larsen of Cable on guitar, Mereschuk left the band. In 1999, Michael Gallagher (formerly of Cast Iron Hike) and Jay Randall (now of Agoraphobic Nosebleed) joined the band, working on Red Sea (1999). Jay Randall's time with the band was brief, and Isis recruited guitarist/keyboardist Bryant Clifford Meyer (formerly of The Gersch) to replace him. After releasing their full-length debut entitled Celestial (2000) and its sister EP, SGNL›05 (2001, on Neurot Recordings), Isis gained national underground attention in the metal/hardcore scene through tours with Cave In and Neurosis. Isis remained with this lineup until their dissolution in 2010.

For the SGNL›05 EP, they contacted Godflesh member Justin Broadrick through their friends in Neurosis to remix the title track from Celestial, which they used as the EP's closer. Following SGNL›05, the band felt a need to expand its ambit, both artistically and in terms of distributive reach. The entire band were avid fans of Melvins, so their label – Mike Patton's Ipecac Recordings – was instantly put forward as an ideal candidate. Turner's friend James Plotkin was already working with Ipecac, so he showed some material to Patton, who, unknown to the band, was already a fan. After discussion, they signed with Ipecac, who went on to issue the band's subsequent studio albums.

Oceanic (2002–2004)
Whereas Celestial was still deeply rooted in heavy metal and hardcore, 2002's follow-up, Oceanic, saw the band acquire new characteristics comparable to post-rock and ambient music, significantly aiding in the birth of the genre of post-metal in what many saw as a logical progression. While much of the material on the album retained the band's former "metallic" intensity, this departure saw the band appeal to a far wider audience; as a result, Oceanic may be the group's most noted album to date, and is widely considered a turning-point in the history of the band. Turner himself describes it as their "quintessential album". It was at the time their most successful release, receiving album-of-the-year accolades from Rock Sound and Terrorizer in 2002, In late 2003, Isis relocated to Los Angeles.

The distinctive tone of material since and including Oceanic had a noticeable impact on avant-garde metal, helping develop the sound of several contemporaries; Cult of Luna, Pelican, Tides, Rosetta, and Russian Circles all cite Isis as an influence. This underground success attracted the attention of the likes of Mogwai, with whom they have toured on numerous occasions.

Oceanic Remixes and Reinterpretations was released in 2004, featuring reinterpretations of songs from Oceanic by a number of influential artists requested by the band. Both Oceanic and Oceanic Remixes feature vocals by Maria Christopher of the band 27. The album featured another remix by Justin Broadrick, who has supported Isis on tours with his band, Jesu, which is signed to Hydra Head Records.

Panopticon (2004–2006)
2004 saw the release of Isis' third album, Panopticon. It signified a further progression many had predicted since Oceanic, with a more advanced post-rock feel to the music both structurally and in terms of sound. Justin Chancellor of Tool makes an appearance on the track, "Altered Course". Overall, it was a very well received album, being awarded 'album of the year' accolades from Rock Sound and reaching No. 47 on Billboard's Top Independent Albums charts; their first entry into any mainstream charts. Before touring the United States, the band performed a free concert at the Los Angeles Museum of Contemporary Art, in a manifestation of the widespread recognition the band had acquired in artistic circles since the release of Oceanic. Reacting to the impact of Oceanic and Panopticon, Revolver named Isis the twelfth-heaviest band of all time in December 2004. On July 23, 2006, they performed Oceanic in full at KOKO in London as part of All Tomorrow's Parties Don't Look Back season.

Clearing the Eye, the band's only DVD, documenting performances over the past five years throughout the world, was released by Ipecac on September 26, 2006. Also in September 2006, a collaboration with Aereogramme entitled In the Fishtank 14 was released as part of a project of Dutch label Konkurrent in which two artists are given two days' studio time to write and record their work.

In the Absence of Truth (2006–2008)

The band finished recording their fourth full-length album, In the Absence of Truth, on July 9, 2006. It was released on October 31, 2006, on Ipecac. The record sees the band again evolving in a manner similar to Oceanic and Panopticon, this time adding new elements of electronics, song structure, drumming complexity, and vocal techniques. It sees the emergence of a more melodic sound than before, and leanings away from previous "drone" inclinations and towards more traditional metal elements, predominantly in the heavier sections. It was also their most commercially successful release, peaking at  number 6 on the Billboard Top Heatseekers chart.

Isis were the opening act for Tool's late 2006 North American tour in support of their new album, 10,000 Days. This led to increased exposure for the band; however, the band members are not particularly comfortable with fame, and tend to keep their affairs private. Turner has stated that "We never imagined that Isis would become as successful or as popular as it has", and confesses: "[Fans] taking a deeply personal interest in who I am, it fucking freaks me out. And I really do feel like sometimes when I get approached, I'm retreating into my shell."

Wavering Radiant and break up (2009–2010)
In April 2009, the band won in the category "Best Underground Metal Act" at Revolver's Golden Gods awards ceremony. The band's fifth studio album, Wavering Radiant, was released shortly afterwards by Ipecac. The CD saw release on May 5, 2009, and a limited vinyl edition on April 29, 2009. It was produced by "Evil" Joe Barresi after years of working with Matt Bayles had grown "routine" for the band.

The album's sound continued Isis' legacy of lengthy songwriting, and presents a slight departure from the soft-loud dynamics which characterised previous releases. Critical appraisal was largely positive; it went on to place well on a handful of best-of lists at the close of the year. Commercially, it was Isis' most successful release ever, breaching the Billboard 200 for the first time and gaining international chart presence.

Extensive touring followed the album's release, taking in headlining shows across the United States, Europe, Japan and Australia with bands including Baroness, Big Business, Cave In and Melvins. The tour took in the 2010 Bonnaroo Music Festival in Manchester, Tennessee, as well as the Soundwave (Australian music festival) in Australia.

On May 18, 2010, Isis announced their decision to break up following their final tour, with their final show to be in Montreal – the location of the band's very first show – on June 23, 2010. Isis collectively stated they have "done everything we wanted to do, said everything we wanted to say," and, as part of an agreement made by the band at its formation, it did not wish to be faced with the possibility that it would "push past the point of a dignified death."

Post-breakup
In the wake of their breakup, they released a split EP with the Melvins in July 2010, featuring the Japanese Wavering Radiant bonus track "Way Through Woven Branches" and the unreleased song "The Pliable Foe", and Hydra Head Records have announced that the entire series of live albums will see digital re-release from May to July 2011.  On November 6, 2012, a compilation double album titled Temporal was released on Ipecac Recordings. The release contained various demo recordings, unreleased tracks and remixes from throughout Isis' history.

In 2011 Jeff Caxide, Aaron Harris and Bryant Clifford Meyer sought out to continue creating music together and formed Palms featuring Chino Moreno of Deftones on vocals and guitar. The resulting self-titled debut album was released on June 25, 2013.

On June 5, 2013, it was announced that a remastered version of their debut album, Celestial would be re-issued by Ipecac Recordings with new artwork from Aaron Turner.  This release was followed on April 29, 2014, with a remastered version of the album Panopticon, and on November 4, 2014, with a remastered version of the album Oceanic, both of which were released by Ipecac Recordings.

In August 2014 Isis changed their name on Facebook to "Isis the band" in order to avoid any confusion with the Islamic State of Iraq and the Levant.

The band reunited for a one-off show on October 13, 2018 (under the name "Celestial") at a benefit for the family of Caleb Scofield, the Cave In bassist who died in a road accident seven months earlier.

Musical style and influences

Turner cites Swans,  Melvins, Tool, Godflesh, and Neurosis as influences to Isis' sound, saying "those bands laid the groundwork for us [...] we're part of a recognizable lineage." Early releases were derided as imitative of predecessors Neurosis, and he admits that the comparisons weren't "completely unjustified". However, material since (and including) Oceanic has not been so often likened to Neurosis; in fact, it has become the case that it is Isis who are being imitated in a burgeoning post-metal scene.

In terms of categorisation, Isis have been described as post-rock, a genre which leans away from the traditional elements of choruses, verses, repetitive vocals, or fast riffing – the latter of which Turner describes as "guitar theatrics". However, post-rock arguably tends to have an essentially halcyon sound, one which rarely uses vocals and typically is devoid of distorted guitars. Isis, however, have origins in hardcore punk and metal, and use aggressive vocal styles similar to hardcore. Their music includes elements of hardcore, drone, ambient music, and post-rock, among others. Revolver critic Dan Epstein noted that "though [Isis were] originally lumped in with the hardcore and doom-metal scenes, the band has long since transcended the musical boundaries of those genres". However, their ongoing acceptance within the pantheon of hardcore music is attested to by Converge's Jacob Bannon, who has gone on record saying that "if I wanna listen to emotional music which I guess is contemporary [...] I'll listen to Isis or something like that – something that is  emotional, powerful music."

Turner, when asked to define Isis, described their sound as "avant-garde, drone-oriented rock, but that doesn't completely cover the bases". At the same time, he is reticent about settling on one label exclusively, and steers away from the use of specific genre labels – "'heavy, atmospheric, droning, post-epic, post-metal, shoegazer blah blah blah.'" When asked how he reacts to being asked to define Isis' sound, he admits "I never know what to say. I'm almost afraid of perpetuating a new tag." Likewise, he also describes their music using a slightly more open-ended tag: as "thinking man's metal"; however, this tag refers to the intellectual elements behind the music, as opposed to exclusively aural ones.

Due to the difficulty in pigeonholing, some fans and critics label Isis as post-metal. This genre is accepted to contain similar-sounding contemporaries such as Pelican, Cult of Luna and Callisto; however, Isis are often credited with the formulation of the genre with the release of Oceanic. In addition to the aforementioned post-metal, hardcore punk, and doom metal, some have described Isis as sludge metal, progressive metal, and even metalcore.

Isis did not write their music for mainstream appeal according to guitarist Michael Gallagher: "... we've never tried to be on the radio, and we've never tried to please others. We've simply done whatever we've wanted to do, and we've all decided to be happy with the results."

Equipment 
Circa 2005, both Turner and Gallagher used Gibson Les Paul guitars with Mesa Boogie V-Twin preamp and a Mackie power amp.

Conceptual elements
Turner has gone on record saying "I like the idea of preserving at least a little shred of mystery and making the band to be more an entity—without hopefully sounding too pretentious – as a work of art [than a traditional rock band]".  Turner has also said in an interview in New Zealand music magazine Rip It Up that "we don't want to hand-feed everything to the listener. We just want to have a sense of mystery". There is a definite attitude that art and music are interchangeable and synonymous to the band; he feels that "the songwriting and the artwork come from the same place". This logic relates to visual and aural aspects as well as overt intellectualisation, through literary references and driving philosophies. Books such as Don Quixote, House of Leaves, Labyrinths and the philosophies of Jeremy Bentham have all played a role in shaping the themes of Isis' releases.

There is an overt intention of progressing heavy music present in Isis' output; a desire to further the intellectual cause that pushes them forward. This is evident within the clear progression of their sound from release to release, their influence on heavy music, and their acceptance in art circles where other metal bands are not so readily embraced. Their stated goal is "not to break away from the scene that [they] came from, but to expand upon it". Publications such as Terrorizer attest to how Turner has completed his goal, explaining that "Aaron Turner has loosened hardcore from its geographical roots, and in the process created an intimate, yet immeasurable vision all of his own". Turner has complained that "metal in general has long been unjustly maligned as solely the province of knuckle-dragging meatheads [...] That said, there's never been a group of musicians like there is now, who are helping to advance the form."

Themes

Most of Isis' releases revolve around a theme. While each release has its own unique theme, many of the major releases interconnect. Turner has stated: "we wanted to have albums that weren't just grab-bags of songs but rather a cohesive experience from beginning to end, from the music to the lyrics to the layout of the record."

No Isis album contains an explicit diegesis, or story arc, instead focusing on themes rather than stories. As such, releases are defined by some as "pseudo-concept albums". The band see lyrics as important, but at the same time, Turner does not feel it necessary to enunciate every word. Instead, any connections made are mainly conjecture, and the formation of a theme takes into account the album artwork, previous albums, track titles and the use of metaphor just as much as lyricism. Oceanic tells a convoluted tale involving love, incest and suicide by drowning. This relates to the theme of the all-powerful female, present lyrically in every album except Panopticon. Turner does not explicitly acknowledge an "overtly feminine theme"; however, he does state: "I just think it's interesting to include that as part of what we do, simply because metal, especially, is considered to be this very male-oriented, testosterone-driven art form, and I feel like it's important to recognize the other side of our nature. As manly as we might or might not be, we have to acknowledge that there is a feminine part of our persona, and that the world isn't made up of absolutes. To achieve balance, you have to recognize every facet of yourself and everyone else around you." Certain threads do reappear between albums, notes Turner. "There are certain themes which reoccur in my work just because of what I'm interested in and what is aesthetically pleasing for me," he says. "The idea of futuristic utopias and dystopias is probably something that does consciously and subconsciously return time and time again [...] and sometimes I just can't help the fact that these themes creep into my work whether it's conscious or not." The other two ongoing motifs in the lyrics and artwork are that of towers and mosquitos.

Panopticon was an overtly political release, and arguably the clearest statement made within their music yet. It displayed fears of surveillance and of tacit governmental influence; its namesake, the panopticon, was Jeremy Bentham's concept for a prison system in which all the prisoners can be viewed by one guard in a central tower, without being able to know whether they are being observed or not. Bentham described the Panopticon as "a new mode of obtaining power of mind over mind, in a quantity hitherto without example." Quizzed on government conspiracies, Turner states: "I do believe that each and every day our government and the huge corporate entities of this country lie to us about numerous subjects. In this respect we are all victims of a huge conspiracy—most of those in power are only concerned with the advancement of their agendas and have no qualms about deceiving and hurting the American people."

After constantly explaining concepts and story outlines to interviewers and fans, Turner chose to keep the thematic basis of In the Absence of Truth quiet. "Through explaining the last two albums time and time again, I just started to become weary of the topic, and I started to feel like I was losing my connection to the music and the lyrics simply from having repeated it so many times [...] I feel there's a lot of emphasis these days placed on explaining everything in such a fashion that there's really nothing left for the listener or reader to explore themselves. It's all spelled out," Turner continues. "So it's interesting to leave some of that stuff open-ended so they have to do a little bit of legwork themselves." He was similarly reticent about revealing much which went into Wavering Radiant, beyond noting that Carl Jung's theories, and dreams, served as inspiration.

Members

Final lineup
Aaron Turner – vocals, guitars (1997–2010)
Jeff Caxide – bass (1997–2010)
Aaron Harris – drums (1997–2010)
Michael Gallagher – guitars (1999–2010)
Bryant Clifford Meyer – electronics, guitars (1999–2010)

Past members
Chris Mereschuk – electronics, vocals (1997–1998)
Randy Larsen – guitars (1998)
Jay Randall – electronics, vocals (1999)

Timeline

Discography

Studio albums
Celestial (2000)
Oceanic (2002)
Panopticon (2004)
In the Absence of Truth (2006)
Wavering Radiant (2009)

References

External links
 
 
 [ Isis] at AllMusic
 ISIS at bandcamp

 
Musical groups established in 1997
1997 establishments in Massachusetts
Musical groups disestablished in 2010
American post-metal musical groups
American sludge metal musical groups
American doom metal musical groups
American avant-garde metal musical groups
Heavy metal musical groups from Massachusetts
Hardcore punk groups from Massachusetts
Ipecac Recordings artists